Alfonso de Iruarrizaga (born 22 August 1957) is a Chilean sport shooter and Olympic medalist. He received a silver medal in skeet shooting at the 1988 Summer Olympics in Seoul. Iruarrizaga was the only medalist for Chile at the 1988 Summer Olympics.

References

External links
 

1957 births
Living people
Chilean male sport shooters
Skeet shooters
Olympic shooters of Chile
Olympic silver medalists for Chile
Shooters at the 1984 Summer Olympics
Shooters at the 1988 Summer Olympics
Shooters at the 1992 Summer Olympics
Olympic medalists in shooting
Pan American Games silver medalists for Chile
Pan American Games bronze medalists for Chile
Pan American Games medalists in shooting
Medalists at the 1988 Summer Olympics
Shooters at the 1979 Pan American Games
Shooters at the 1983 Pan American Games
20th-century Chilean people